The Switzerland national beach soccer team represents Switzerland in international beach soccer competitions and is controlled by the Swiss Football Association, the governing body for football in Switzerland.

Results and fixtures

The following is a list of match results in the last 12 months, as well as any future matches that have been scheduled.

Legend

2021

Coaching staff

Current coaching staff

Technical Assistant:  Georges Klauser
Team Doctor:  Dr. Thomas Schwamborn

Managerial history

 Angelo Schirinzi (????–)

Players

Current squad
The following players and staff members were called up for the 2021 FIFA Beach Soccer World Cup.

Head coach: Angelo Schirinzi
Assistant coach: Davor Ivcevic

Competitive record

FIFA Beach Soccer World Cup

Honours
2005 Euro Beach Soccer Cup winner
2009 FIFA Beach Soccer World Cup runners-up
2011 Euro Beach Soccer League Superfinal runners-up
2012 Euro Beach Soccer League Superfinal winner

References

External links
Swiss Beach Soccer
BSWW profile

European national beach soccer teams
Beach Soccer